The Southern Local School District is a public school district based in Racine, Ohio, United States.

The school district includes all of Letart and Sutton townships as well as the central and southern portions of Lebanon Township.

Two incorporated villages, Racine and Syracuse, are served by Southern Local Schools. A notable unincorporated community in the district is Portland.

Schools
Southern High School (Grades 7–12)
Southern Elementary School (Grades K-6)

See also
List of school districts in Ohio

School districts in Ohio
Education in Meigs County, Ohio